Ernest Melvin Koy (born October 22, 1942) is a former American football running back for the New York Giants of the National Football League (NFL).  He played college football at the University of Texas from 1962 to 1964 and was drafted by the Giants in the 11th round of the 1965 NFL Draft.  He was a member of the 1963 Texas Longhorns football team, which won a national championship, although he missed most of the season to injury and illness.  His brother Ted Koy also played with the Longhorns and in the NFL.  His father, Ernie Koy, played Major League Baseball from 1938 through 1942 for five teams, and also played football at Texas.

During his six years in the NFL, Koy played in 79 games, carried 414 times and gained 1,723 yards.  He also has 498 receiving yards with 76 receptions, many from quarterback Fran Tarkenton.  In addition, he completed six passes in 12 attempts, with one touchdown and one interception.

Koy was also the Giants' punter with a 38.5 yard average, and returned 30 kicks during his career.

After he retired from the NFL, Koy began a career in banking.  He returned to his hometown of Bellville, Texas to work at a savings and loan there.  He later worked for Austin County State Bank, which was eventually sold to Wells Fargo.

References

1942 births
Living people
American football punters
American football running backs
New York Giants players
Texas Longhorns football players
Eastern Conference Pro Bowl players
People from Bellville, Texas
Players of American football from Texas